Roberto Francisco Chiari Remón (March 2, 1905 in Panama City – March 1, 1981) was the President of Panama in 1949 and from 1960 to 1964. He belonged to the Liberal Party.

Before being president

He was president of the Chamber of Commerce. He worked in the sugar company of his family with his father Rodolfo Chiari and brothers. He was the only one of his brothers that was interested on politics.  He was elected to the National Assembly in 1940.  During the Ricardo de la Guardia administration he was Minister of Health and Public Works. He was one of Domingo Díaz Arosemena's vice presidents and briefly served as acting president in 1949. He lost the presidential elections of 1952. He was president of his Liberal Party for the next 8 years.

1960 election
He was elected in a clean and peaceful election. He was campaigning against former president Ricardo Arias and Victor Goytia.

Administration

His government worked hard on the education sector. The General Hospital of the Social Security was inaugurated and an extensive vaccination program was developed.

His administration is most remembered for the historic events of January 9, 1964, known today as Martyrs' Day. During a dispute between Panamanian and American students regarding the right to raise the Panamanian flag instead of the U.S. flag at Balboa High School the Panamanian flag was accidentally torn. This flag desecration sparked four days of fighting between civilians and the US Army. 22 Panamanians and four Americans died. Following these events, Chiari made the decision to break diplomatic relations with the United States, making Panama the first Latin American country to make this call.  This spurred negotiations that ultimately ended in the 1977 Torrijos-Carter Treaties, which disbanded the Canal Zone and relinquished U.S. control of the Panama Canal to Panama on December 31, 1999. Because of this, Chiari is known as el presidente de la dignidad (The President of Dignity).

Post-presidency
After leaving office, he retired from public life and he returned to work in his private companies. He was president of the Industrial Sindicate from 1967 to 1969.

References

External links
 "55 mandatarios" (55 presidents). History Album of the Panamanian newspaper La Prensa. Page 62–64.
 http://robert-mimundo.blogspot.com/2016/03/recordando-al-presidente-de-la-dignidad.html

1905 births
1981 deaths
People from Panama City
Panamanian people of Italian descent
Presidents of Panama
Vice presidents of Panama
National Liberal Party (Panama) politicians
Children of national leaders